In late March 2022, the March 23 Movement (M23) launched an offensive in North Kivu, clashing with the Armed Forces of the Democratic Republic of the Congo (FARDC) and MONUSCO. The fighting displaced tens of thousands of civilians and caused renewed tensions between the Democratic Republic of the Congo and Rwanda, as the latter was accused of supporting the rebel offensive.

Background 

The March 23 Movement waged a rebellion in the northeastern Democratic Republic of the Congo (DRC) from 2012 to 2013. M23 was formed by deserters of the DRC Armed Forces (FARDC) who had previously been members of the CNDP rebel group and been dissatisfied with the conditions of their service. Both the CNDP as well as the March 23 Movement's first rebellion were supported by Rwanda and Uganda. The uprising was defeated by a joint campaign of the DRC and MONUSCO, the local United Nations peacekeeping force. After agreeing to a peace deal, M23 was largely dismantled, its fighters disarmed and moved into refugee camps in Uganda.

Despite the agreement, hostilities between M23 and the DR Congo continued. In 2017, M23 commander Sultani Makenga and about 100 to 200 of his followers fled from Uganda to resume their insurgency, setting up camp at Mount Mikeno in the border area between Rwanda, Uganda, and the DR Congo. Makenga's force launched a minor offensive against the FARDC in 2021; however, this operation achieved little, as M23 no longer enjoyed significant international support. Uganda and the DR Congo had greatly improved their relations, cooperating against a common enemy, the Allied Democratic Forces, during Operation Shujaa. In early 2022, a growing number of M23 combatants began leaving their camps and move back to the DR Congo; the rebel movement launched more attacks in February 2022, but these were repelled. The M23 leadership argued that parts of their movement had resumed the insurgency because the conditions of the 2013 peace deal were not being honored by the DRC government. The rebels also argued that they were attempting to defend Kivu's Tutsi minority from attacks by Hutu militants such as the Democratic Forces for the Liberation of Rwanda (FDLR).

The situation was further complicated by the factionalism within M23, as the movement was split into rival groups, namely the "Alliance for the Salvation of the People" headed by Jean-Marie Runiga, and the "Revolutionary Army of Congo" of Bertrand Bisimwa respectively. In addition, Makenga's group was de facto separate from the other M23 forces which were still mainly based in Uganda. Later research organized by the United Nations Security Council suggested that Makenga's return to an insurgency had started the gradual rearmament and restoration of M23, with Bisimwa's "Revolutionary Army of Congo" joining these efforts in late 2021 by reorganizing its remaining fighters and recruiting new ones in cooperation with Makenga. The headquarters of the restored M23 is believed to be located at Mount Sabyinyo.

By 2022, M23 was just one of 120 armed groups that operate in the eastern DR Congo. Before March 2022, the Congoloese government made attempts to reinforce its position against the resurgent M23 by sending more troops. However, such measures weakened its presence in other areas, such as those affected by the Allied Democratic Forces insurgency.

Offensive

Initial rebel attacks 
In the night of 27 March 2022, M23 rebels launched a new offensive in North Kivu, first attacking the villages of Tshanzu and Runyoni in the Rutshuru Territory from their strongholds at the surrounding hills. The two villages had been important strongholds of the M23 Movement during the 2012–13 rebellion. The rebel attack was reportedly led by Sultani Makenga. The DRC government claimed that Rwanda supported the insurgent operation, a claim which was denied by the Rwandan government and the rebels. International Crisis Group researcher Onesphore Sematumba argued that claims about Rwandan aid were believable. He suggested that the resurgence of M23 was probably influenced by Rwanda's wish to stop an infrastructure project which would link the DR Congo and Uganda.

On 29 March, the FARDC was able to repel a rebel attack against the border town of Bunagana, but M23 captured several villages, including Mugingo, Gasiza, Chengerero, Rugamba, Kibote, Baseke and Kabindi. In addition, a UN helicopter crashed at Tshanzu, killing eight MONUSCO peacekeepers (six Pakistanis, a Russian, and a Serbian). The FARDC blamed M23 rebels for shooting down the aircraft. At Bunagana, the FARDC received support by the Uganda People's Defence Force (UPDF). UPDF ground forces crossed the border, while Ugandan aircraft bombed the rebels. By 1 April, the clashes at Rutshuru had displaced 46,000 locals according to UNHCR. Meanwhile, the M23 fighters temporarily retreated back to their mountain bases, with their first attacks being regarded as a failure. They proclaimed a unilateral ceasefire. One ex-M23 officer told the newspaper taz that it was entirely unclear what the rebel offensive was trying to achieve, with him speculating that Makenga was possibly hoping for one last battle to die in his homeland.

Failure of peace talks and resumption of fighting 

On 6 April, the FARDC rejected any negotiations with the M23 forces based in the DR Congo, and started a counter-attack. Four days later, M23 announced that it would withdraw its troops from any villages captured during the earlier clashes. However, as the fighting raged on, FARDC increasingly lost ground to the insurgents.  In late April, the DRC government and a number of rebel groups held peace talks in Nairobi, but the Bisimwa faction of M23 voluntarily left or was expelled from the negotiations due to the ongoing clashes in North Kivu.

M23 forces, reportedly led by Makenga and including the Bisimwa faction, restarted their offensive in May. This operation was reportedly supported by at least 1,000 Rwandan soldiers. According to a local, M23 overran Kibumba on 18 May. On 19 May, M23 rebels attacked MONUSCO peacekeepers at Shangi, Rutshuru Territory, as the latter joined the FARDC in counter-insurgency operations. The rebel leadership declared that the attack was in response to a previous joint FARDC-FDLR operation. From 22 May, the rebels attempted to advance on North Kivu's provincial capital, Goma, displacing 70,000 people. From 22 to 23 May, a battle raged at Kibumba, while the insurgents temporarily seized Rumangabo before it was retaken by the FARDC. According to independent researchers, the insurgents were supported by Rwandan soldiers during the battle for Rumangabo.

On 25 May, M23 reached Goma's outskirts, but were repelled by MONUSCO, FARDC, and the FDLR after heavy fighting. The insurgents subsequently retreated, and there was a pause in fighting for the rest of the month. At this point, the FARDC accused the Rwanda Defence Force (RDF) of fighting directly alongside the rebels, claiming that local vigilantes had captured two Rwandan soldiers. On the other side, Rwanda claimed that the DR Congo had fired rockets into its territory, was aided by the FDLR, and had "abducted" the two RDF soldiers. The fighting also stoked local ethnic tensions; North Kivu's deputy police commander, Francois-Xavier Aba van Ang, released a video urging civilians to organize as militiamen to combat M23 in a "people's war". The FARDC also armed existing local militias so that they could assist in the campaign against M23.

Fall of Bunagana, further rebel advances, and pro-government counter-attacks 

By early June, clashes again took place at Bunagana. M23 militants reportedly attacked a MONUSCO force at Muhati, Rutshuru Territory, on 8 June. On 12 June, the FARDC repelled another M23 attack on Bunagana, coinciding with the visit of King Philippe of Belgium at Bukavu to the south. Unlike the previous attack on Bunagana, however, the Ugandan security forces across the border did not intervene and instead retreated from the hills overlooking the town. M23 captured Bunagana on the following day, reportedly after encircling it and thus forcing the local garrison of 137 soldiers and 37 police officers to retreat to Kisoro in Uganda. There, they surrendered to the local Ugandan security forces. Many civilians also fled across the border. North Kivu's military governor Constant Ndima Kongba initially denied that the FARDC had lost the city, but the FARDC spokesman Sylvain Ekenge later declared that the fall of Bunagana constituted "no less than an invasion" by Rwanda. Tensions between Rwanda and the DR Congo consequently continued to escalate, as the latter suspended "all agreements" with the former. At this point, two senior Congolese security sources and members of the Congolese parliament also accused Uganda of supporting the rebel offensive. The Congolese parliamentarians claimed that the Ugandan retreat before the rebel attack had facilitated the takeover, and specifically singled out Muhoozi Kainerugaba, head of the Ugandan troops involved in Operation Shujaa, for supporting M23. The DR Congo proceeded to terminate the military cooperation with Uganda. The Ugandan government subsequently halted Operation Shujaa, while the Ugandan military claimed that M23's latest attacks did not pose a threat to Ugandan citizens and equipment, making an intervention on their part unnecessary. The local MONUSCO leadership stated that the claims about the Ugandan support for M23 were "nonsense" and called for calm and cooperation.

Kenyan President Uhuru Kenyatta reacted to the fall of Bunagana and the growing regional tensions by calling for the East African Community (EAC) to "immediate[ly]" organize a new peacekeeping mission called the "East African Regional Force" to restore security in the eastern DR Congo. Meanwhile, MONUSCO began to prepare its local troops to support the efforts of the Congoloese security forces to retake the city. FARDC troops belonging to operations sector "Sokola 2" launched an attack from Kabindi on 16 June, and later claimed that they had recaptured Bunagana. However, the city was reportedly still in rebel hands on the following day, with heavy fighting taking place to its west. M23 reportedly counter-attacked, capturing the town of Tshengerero and the villages of Bugusa, Kabindi and Rangira. The insurgents were advancing on Rutshuru, and shot down a FARDC helicopter. Fighting had also spread into the Virunga National Park. Environmentalists pointed out that this threatened the survival of the local mountain gorillas.

The renewed advances of M23 were reportedly part of a plan by Sultani Makenga to cut off and eventually capture Goma, hoping to extract political concessions from the Congolese government in this way. By 18–19 June, the frontline had stabilized along the Rutshuru-Bunagana axis. Combined FARDC-MONUSCO forces still held settlements in the direct vicinity of Tshengerero such as Ntamugenga and Rwanguba, including the latter's important bridge. Fighting shifted to the Runyoni-Rumangabo axis, where clashes were reported at the villages of Kavumu and Bikenge. Meanwhile, an EAC meeting was organized in Nairobi to discuss the diplomatic tensions between the DR Congo, Rwanda, and Uganda as well as the deployment of a new peacekeeping force in reaction to the M23 attacks. The DRC government declared that it would welcome an EAC peacekeeping mission, but only under the condition of Rwanda's exclusion from the operation. The EAC subsequently called on M23 to retreat from Bunagana as precondition for a casefire, but the insurgents rejected the order. Instead, M23 reopened the Bunagana border post under its own administration, whereupon North Kivu's government forbid the import and export of goods through rebel-held territory.

Pro-government forces retake territory and stalemate 

From 19 to 22 June, clashes continued as M23 attempted to break through FARDC defense positions. At first, the rebels assaulted villages along the southern axis, but were repelled at Karambi, Kitagoma and Kitovu, Bweza, and Busanza. They subsequently focused on Bikenge, Ruvumu, Shangi, and Bukima, overrunning the villages before the FARDC organized a counter-attack. The military was able to retake most of these settlements, though Ruvumu, Buharo, and Rutokara reportedly remained rebel-held. Overall, the pro-government forces generally held their positions, but the rebel assaults increasingly threatened the Matebe-Rwanguba axis. Human Rights Watch reported that 17 civilians, including two children, had been summarily executed on 21 June by the M23 for suspected collaboration with the FARDC. According to the newspaper Eco News, the FARDC reportedly inflicted a defeat on M23 at the Runyoni frontline around this time, wounding Sultani Makenga and killing another rebel commander, Colonel Yusuf Mboneza. Mboneza's death was later disputed by pro-M23 sources. There was a lull in fighting from 24 to 27 June. Combat resumed on 28 June, as rebels attacked FARDC positions at Bushandaba, Ruseke and the strategic hill of Bikona. Pro-government forces, consisting of the military and police, counter-attacked, and retook the villages of Nkokwe, Ruvumu, Rugarama, Rutakara, Ntamugenga and Rutsiro. On 29 June, the FARDC continued its advance, capturing Kabindi and Chengerero, though M23 militants countered by attacking Rutsiro.

On 1 July, the FARDC claimed to had won a major victory over M23 and allied Rwandan troops after heavy fighting at Rutsiro, Ntamugenga and Nyabikona, completely evicting the insurgents from the Bweza grouping (groupement) in Rutshuru. Clashes continued at Bikenge and Ruseke on 4 July, as the FARDC repelled M23 assaults. On 6 July, the FARDC reorganized the leadership of the forces opposing M23 to improve their efficiency; in addition, Rwandan President Paul Kagame and the Congolese President Félix Tshisekedi held a meeting on the same day. According to the Congolese side, a ceasefire and the withdrawal of M23 from Congoloese soil was agreed upon. Instead of adhering to this agreement, the rebels attacked Kanyabusoro and Rwanguba on the following day. Over the next days, clashes continued at various villages in the Bweza and Jomba groupements, as M23 attempted to retake territory. At the same time, however, combat died down along other parts of the frontline.

In the following days, combat largely ceased in the Bweza and Jomba groupements, but fighting erupted in the Kisigari groupement and at two important hills near Rumangabo. Heavy fighting also took place in the Bashali Mukoto groupement, Masisi Territory, as two "Nyatura" factions clashed. One of them was a "dissident" group led by Jean-Marie Nyatura who was considered close to M23; Jean-Marie Nyatura's force attempted to capture several villages before being evicted from most of them by its local rivals. After this point, there was again a lull in fighting. Negotiations continued between Rwanda and the DR Congo under international mediation, though little progress was made. On 14 July, Ugandan President Yoweri Museveni made another attempt at convincing M23 and the Congolese government to organize a ceasefire. Meanwhile, MONUSCO and the FARDC announced that they were shifting forces from other areas to prepare for an operation to fully push M23 back. On 18 July, Congolese government spokesman Patrick Muyaya Katembwe reaffirmed that any negotiations with the rebels depended on M23 retreating from its occupied territory beforehand.

By the end of July, M23 was installing its own officials in the occupied territories and raised a tax. Violent protests also erupted in Goma and other eastern Congolese cities, with civilians attacking MONUSCO members and buildings, accusing the organization of inaction in the face of the ongoing regional rebellions. Protesters, MONUSCO peacekeepers, and bystanders were killed during the clashes. The North Africa Post alleged that the rebels had used the protests as cover for attacks, and had been involved in an attack on Moroccan peacekeepers at Nyamilima. One MONUSCO soldier was killed in a direct clash with M23 at Bunagana. On 27 July, fighting between M23 and FARDC resumed at Kabingo, Rutshuru, as the rebels attempted to harvest the crops planted by locals but were confronted by government soldiers. On 2 August, the rebels and FARDC fought at five villages in Rutshuru. In the following weeks, however, a truce held along the frontline. This was condemned by many local civilians who argued that it allowed the rebels to consolidate their territorial gains.

On 15 August, the first contingent of East African Community peacekeepers arrived in Kivu. This group, consisting of Burundian soldiers, pleged to assist in the campaign against M23 and other insurgent factions. The arrival of the Burundian peacekeepers received mixed reactions by local civil groups; some welcomed them, some considered the Burundians to be exploitative foreigners, and some took a more neutral stance. Sporadic clashes restarted on 16 August, when rebels, allegedly supported by Rwandan troops, attacked Rwanguba, Rangira, and Muhibira in Rutshuru. The M23 leadership claimed that these operations were in response to FARDC aggression, and declared that it wanted a "dialogue" with the government. On 19 August, M23 shelled FARDC positions at Jomba, Bweza and Busanza.

Renewed offensive 
Fighting renewed on 20 October after according to the FARDC, M23 attacked a military post. on 23 October M23 group captured the town of Ntamugenga killing five soldiers, fighting soon spread to the strategic RN2, four civilians were killed and 40 were injured in the fighting. By 24 October fighting caused more than 23,000 people to flee their homes. the offensive continued along the RN2 highway leading to M23 capturing the towns of Rubare, Kalengera, and Kako. On 29 October M23 rebels took control of Rutshuru and Kiwanja. Around this time, allegedly Rwandan-equipped Nyatura rebels clashed with FDLR militants at in Rugari. In response to the offensive, the government of the DRC ordered the Rwandan Ambassador to the country, Vincent Karega, to leave within the next 48 hours.

Anti-Rwandan protests broke out on 31 October in Goma, demanding that the DRC leave the East African Community and that Russia intervene in the conflict. Government spokesman Patrick Muyaya said that the DRC would not negotiate with M23. On 2 November, Kenya announced that it would send 900 soldiers to fight against the M23. Riots broke out in Goma after rumors of the UN transporting M23, and several UN vehicles were burned by rioting civilians. The UN accounted a "strategic and tactical withdrawal" from the Rumangabo military base. On 7 November, the Congolese military stated they were training 3,000 new recruits to go and fight M23, and soon after began to bomb the rebels with two fighter jets. Rwanda protested that a Congolese Air Force Sukhoi Su-25 had violated its airspace.

By 15 November 2022, M23 had pushed to the towns of Rugari and Tongo clashing with the FARDC. A M23 attack on Kibumba was initially repelled. As the insurgents advanced, hundreds of civilians fled. By 17 November, M23 claimed to have captured the towns of Kibumba, Ruhunda, Buhumba, Kabuhanga, Tongo, and Mulimbi from the FDLR who they accuse of working with the Congolese army. The Ugandan military said that they would participate in the fight against the M23 joining Kenyan troops. On 18 November, Rwanda declared a ceasefire on behalf of the rebels. By late November, the FARDC had reportedly formed a coalition with several local militias, including FLDR, Mai-Mai groups, and some Nyatura factions.

A MONUSCO investigation reported in December that massacres by the M23 in November killed at least 131 civilians in the Rutshuru Territory villages of Bambo and Kishishe. The victims included 102 men, 17 women and 12 children, each of whom were "arbitrarily executed... as part of reprisals against the civilian population" who were perceived to be aligned with the government. On 23 December, M23 was forced by heavy international pressure to officially hand over Kibumba to the EAC Regional Force. Despite this, their withdrawal was only partial; the insurgents maintained a presence in the town's outskirts. FARDC declared the alleged handover of Kibumba a "sham", intended to distract from M23's attempts to advance in other areas. On 28 December 2022, South Sudan sent a contingency of 750 troops to join the East African Contingency to be stationed in Goma. Over the next weeks, heavy fighting took place between M23 and a number of rival militias allied to FARDC, including APCLS which declared its aim to capture Bwiza from the rebels. Meanwhile, M23 captured several villages and the town of Nyamilima near the Ugandan border.

In January, clashes continued even as M23 declared its intention to surrender the Rumangabo military base to the EAC Regional Force. On 18 January Felix Tshisekedi accused the M23 of not withdrawing from the seized territory as agreed. On 24 January a Congolese Su-25 was damaged by ground fire from Rwanda after Rwanda said it violated its airspace. On 27 January M23 captured the city of Kitshanga causing people to flee and take refuge in the nearby UN base. Kitshanga's capture cut off the road linking Butembo, North Kivu's second largest city, to Goma. After two days of heavy fighting, M23 seized the village of Mushaki on February 24, forcing civilians to flee and threatening supply routes to Goma. Three days later M23 took the town of Rubaya and its coltan mines. The next day, the town of Mweso also fell to the rebels.

Analysis

Rwandan role 
As a result of the M23 advances in 2022, Bintou Keita, top UN official for the DRC, described the group as having "conducted itself as a conventional army, rather than an armed group," and warned that the group's capabilities exceeded that of MONUSCO. According to United Nations Security Council researchers, the presence of individuals in Rwandan uniforms among the rebels has been proven through photos and drone footage, partially explaining the M23 forces' increased professionalism. Congolese researcher Josaphat Musamba concurred, arguing that it was "clear that there is support" behind M23's resurgence. Congo Research Group director Jason Stearns stated that, though there was "no certainty" about Rwanda backing the M23 offensive, the rebels' firepower and various frontline reports made Rwandan involvement "very likely". Regardless of Rwanda's possible role in the offensive, analysts cautioned that M23 had never been just a Rwandan pawn, and always maintained its own agenda.

In early August, a report for the UN by independent researchers provided further evidence about Rwandan support for M23, including photos and videos showcasing Rwandan soldiers moving into Congolese territory and M23 troops armed with Rwandan weaponry. In October, a Rwandan soldier surrendered to MONUSCO at Kiwanja; the Congolese government regarded this as a further proof of Rwandan support for the rebel offensive. By January 2023, the United States, several European countries, and UN experts believed that Rwanda was supporting M23.

Motives of M23 
Stearns argued that the new M23 offensive was possibly aimed at enforcing the group's inclusion in a disarmament, demobilisation, and reintegration (DDR) programme. Previous attempts of M23 at becoming part of this process, including after the 2013 agreement, failed due to considerable opposition by the Congolese public. One of the issues hampering any attempts to achieve M23's complete demobilisation is the fact that several members of the rebel group are known to have committed various war crimes over several years of involvement in insurgencies, even before M23 itself had emerged. This makes their integration into the Congolese security forces or rewarding them with amnesties difficult to justify in the DR Congo.

Notes

References

Works cited

External links 
 

 
Military operations involving India
Military operations involving Kenya
Military operations involving Pakistan
Military operations involving Russia
Military operations involving Serbia
Military operations involving Tanzania
2022 military operations